The Innovation and Networks Executive Agency (INEA) was an executive agency established by the European Commission  in order to run the Connecting Europe Facility and parts of Horizon 2020, with legacy programmes of the TEN-T programme and the Marco Polo programme. It superseded the Trans-European Transport Network Executive Agency (TEN-T EA) on 31 December 2013.

The Agency was in charge of all open TEN-T projects. The projects represent all transport modes – air, rail, road, and maritime/sea – plus logistics and intelligent transport systems, and involve all EU Member States.

Its status as an executive agency meant that, although independent, INEA was closely linked with its parent, the Directorate-General for Mobility and Transport (DG MOVE). DG MOVE deals with all policy-making issues related to the TEN-T programme, while the Agency existed to execute the programme's specific tasks.

The Innovation and Networks Executive Agency (INEA) ended its operations on 31 March 2021 and was replaced by the European Climate, Infrastructure and Environment Executive Agency (CINEA).

References 

Executive agencies of the European Commission
2006 establishments in Belgium
2006 in the European Union
Government agencies established in 2006
Organisations based in Brussels
Information technology organizations based in Europe
International organisations based in Belgium
Transport and the European Union